Kharu may refer to:
 Kharu, Kashmar, Razavi Khorasan Province
 Kharu, a Chuhra caste
 Khowr, Razavi Khorasan

See also
Kharv
Kharv, South Khorasan